The 2000 IAAF Golden League was the third edition of the annual international track and field meeting series, held from 23 June to 1 September. It was contested at seven European meetings: the Meeting Gaz de France, Golden Gala, Bislett Games, Weltklasse Zürich, Herculis, Memorial Van Damme and the Internationales Stadionfest (ISTAF).

The Golden League jackpot consisted of 50 kilograms of gold bars. The jackpot was available to athletes who won at least five of the seven competitions of the series in one of the 12 specified events (7 for men, 5 for women). The jackpot events for 2000 were:
Men: 100 m, 1500 m, 3000 m, 400 m hurdles, high jump, pole vault, shot put
Women: 100 m, 1500 m, 100 m hurdles, long jump, javelin throw

The jackpot winners were Maurice Greene of the United States, Morocco's Hicham El Guerrouj, Norwegian Trine Hattestad, and Tatyana Kotova of Russia. Hattestad set two world records in the javelin during the series, throwing 68.22 metres at the Golden Gala, then 69.48 metres at the Bislett Games.

Shot putter CJ Hunter tested positive at the Bislett Games and his results from that meeting onwards were annulled. Marion Jones, his wife at the time, also later had her results from the final ISTAF meeting annulled as she later admitted to doping.

Results

References

Results
Oslo
Paris
Rome
Monaco
Zurich
Brussels
Berlin

External links
IAAF competition website

Golden League
IAAF Golden League